Bad Lippspringe is a town in the district of Paderborn, in North Rhine-Westphalia, Germany.

Geography
The river Lippe has its source in Bad Lippspringe, and the town is noted for its powerful river springs, many hospitals and its beautiful state gardening show in 2017. Bad Lippspringe has been twinned with Newbridge, County Kildare, Ireland since 2008.

History
Lippspringe is mentioned in chronicles as early as the 9th century, and here in the 13th century the order of the Templars established a stronghold. It received civic rights about 1400. Friedrich Wilhelm Weber was born here in 1817.

Sports
The local football team is BV Bad Lippspringe, which Antonio Di Salvo started his career with, after being born nearby.

Bad Lippspringe is home to RAPA (Rhine Army Parachute Association), a British Army Parachute and Skydiving Dropzone. This was formed in 1964 and is still going today.

People born in Bad Lippspringe born or connected to the city 
 Friedrich Wilhelm Weber (1813–1894), German epic poet, fountain doctor in Lippspringe
 Alexander Hermann, Count of Wartensleben (1650–1734), Prussian field marshal
 Friedrich Kühn (1907–1979), German politician of the CDU, who was born in Bad Lippspringe
 Wilhelm Wegener (1911–2004), legal historian and genealogist
 Erich Fuchs (1921–2008), German internist and allergist, many years top and chief physician at the Asthma Clinic Allergy Research Institute in Bad Lippspringe
 Sabine Lösing (born 1955), member of the European Parliament, grew up in Bad Lippspringe
 Markus Gellhaus (born 1970), German football coach, played football at BV Bad Lippspringe
 Antonio Di Salvo (born 1979), Italian footballer, played football at BV Bad Lippspringe

Galllery

References

External links
 Official site 
 Bad Lippspringe Notgeld (Emergency banknotes from the town of Lippspringe) http://webgerman.com/Notgeld/Directory/L/Lippspringe1.htm  One note shows the baptism of the Saxons in 776 after submitting to Charlemagne (Die Sachsentaufe).

Paderborn (district)
Spa towns in Germany